Helmut Wallner (22 March 1946 – 11 August 2020) was an Austrian footballer. He played in three matches for the Austria national football team in 1969.

References

External links
 

1946 births
2020 deaths
Austrian footballers
Austria international footballers
Place of birth missing
Association footballers not categorized by position